Tribhuvandas Kishibhai Patel (22 October 1903 - 3 June 1994)  freedom fighter, a Gandhian,. Tribhuvandas Patel's single quality that stands out is his utter dislike for self promotion, a quality that many admire in the numerous institutions he built and served.

Early life and participation in freedom struggle
Born on 22 October 1903, in Anand, Gujarat, to Kishibhai Patel, Tribhuvandas became a follower of Mahatma Gandhi and Sardar Vallabhbhai Patel during the Indian independence movement, and especially the civil disobedience movements, which led to his repeated imprisonment in 1930, 1935 and 1942.

Cooperative movement
He is known as the father of the cooperative movement in India.

By the late 1940s, he started working with farmers in Kheda district, under the guidance of Sardar Vallabhbhai Patel, and after setting up the Kaira District Co-operative Milk Producer's Union in 1946 under his chairmanship, he hired a young manager named Verghese Kurien in year 1950,who was instrumental in developing the technical and marketing strategies of the Union which was eventually called Amul. Verghese Kurien remained the general manager of Amul till 2005. Under Tribhuvandas Patel's leadership and guidance and together with Verghese Kurien, many organizations were started in Anand including the Gujarat Cooperative Milk Marketing Federation, National Dairy Development Board and Institute of Rural Management Anand. The relationship between Tribhuvandas and Kurien was one of teacher and pupil, architect and builder and almost father and son. Kurien was very dear to Tribhuvandas, he trusted Kurien above all and in his eyes and mind, Kurien could do no wrong. The fruits of their work are still hanging from the trees planted 75 years ago.

Tribhuvandas Patel was awarded the 1963 Ramon Magsaysay Award for 'Community Leadership', together with Dara Nusserwanji Khurody, and Verghese Kurien., and the Padma Bhushan from the Govt. of India in 1964.

He remained Secretary/President of the Pradesh Congress Committee (PCC), Indian National Congress (Congress I), and also a member of Rajya Sabha twice, 1967–1968 and 1968 -1974 from the party.

Under the selfless leadership of Tribhuvandas Patel, in August 1973, Amul celebrated its 25th anniversary with Morarji Desai, Maniben Patel and Verghese Kurien. When he voluntarily retired from the Chairmanship of AMUL, in the early 1970s,  he was presented with a purse of six hundred thousand rupees, by the grateful members of the village cooperatives — one rupee per member being the contribution. He used this fund to start a charitable trust, named the Tribhuvandas Foundation - an NGO to work on women and child health in Kheda district. He was the first Chairman of Tribhuvandas Foundation. He handed over the chairmanship to Verghese Kurien, when the organization started to grow quickly, after receiving funds from foreign grant s.

The former chairperson of the National Dairy Development Board, Dr.(Ms) Amrita Patel assessed Tribhuvandas Foundation in an international workshop. Tribhuvandas Foundation, which is Asia’s largest NGO, works in over 600 villages in the State in the field of maternal and infant care. What is unique about the programme of the Foundation is that it rides on the back of milk. It is the village milk co-operative that appoints a village health worker and pays an honorarium to the village health worker to undertake the work. So it is milk paying for health."

Tribhuvandas Patel worked tirelessly till the last day of his life. He was working to setup cooperative organizations for farming commodities such as oil. In the days leading to his passing on June 3, 1994, thousands of farmers from all over Kaira visited him, assuring him that the movement started in 1946 will continue forever. In these last days, he frequently asked about Kurien who, despite the urgency conveyed to him, never visited him before his passing. In his last moments, it was Kurien on his mind and therefore in the eyes of many, for Kurien to not visit him, felt like a betrayal of ultimate magnitude. There are many powerful stories about Tribhuvandas that have not been heard and there can be many reasons (e.g. stories are written in Gujarati) but certainly it is not due to lack of stories. Tribhuvandas Patel was presented with a purse of six hundred thousand rupees by the members of the village cooperatives, as one rupee per member of the society, as a contribution when he voluntarily retired from the Chairmanship of AMUL, in the early 1970s,thanking him for his efforts.

Among the various contributions of Tribhuvandas, an important contribution occurred in an area that he had little time and interest for. Bollywood was making a biographical film on his mentor Sardar Vallabhbhai Patel titled Sardar. The film was almost complete but was shelved because of some financial difficulty. Tribhuvandas made the financial contributions necessary to have the film completed and released. It is unknown if he watched the film as it was released towards the last years of his life but the release of film exposed the many events that occurred around the time of India's independence, events and facts that were never known to general public. In particular, the illustration of power and sacrifices of Sardar Patel, who most Indians today feel was the greatest leader that India ever produced.

Awards and honours
 1963: Ramon Magsaysay Award for 'Community Leadership'
 1964: Padma Bhushan

Personal life
He was married to Shrimati Mani Laxmi, and had one daughter and six sons. He had several grandchildren, great-grandchildren, and great-great-grandchildren.

References

Further reading
Profile of Tribhuvandas K. Patel on 'Ramon Magsaysay Award Site'
Magsaysay Award Profile
AMUL's 25th Anniversary Celebrations

External links
Ramon Magsaysay Award Citation
 The Making of Amul, Dr. Verghese Kurien
 Mention of Tribhuvandas Kishibhai Patel's death
 The-Indian-Milkman-Tribhuvandas-Patel

1903 births
1994 deaths
Gujarati people
Indian cooperative organizers
Indian independence activists from Gujarat
Ramon Magsaysay Award winners
Recipients of the Padma Bhushan in social work
Rajya Sabha members from Gujarat
Indian National Congress politicians from Gujarat
People from Anand district
Social workers from Gujarat
20th-century Indian educators
Trade unionists from Gujarat